When Will I Be Loved is a 2004 American erotic drama film written and directed by James Toback and starring Neve Campbell. The film had a 35-page script and was mostly improvised throughout its 12-day shoot.

Plot 
Vera (Neve Campbell) is a femme fatale for the 21st century: a beautiful, capricious young woman living in New York who begins exploring the limits of her sexual and intellectual power. She picks up men on the street and has sex with them in her apartment. She also videotapes a sexual romp with a female lover and has sexually frank discussions with her potential employer. As the daughter of wealthy, indulgent parents, Vera seems to be improvising her way through the beginning of her life as an adult.

Her boyfriend, Ford (Frederick Weller), is a fast-talking hustler prepared to do anything to make a buck. Aware of Vera's promiscuity, Ford sees a chance to make big money when he meets an ageing Italian media mogul, named Count Tommaso (Dominic Chianese), who is enamoured of Vera because of her sexuality, her intelligence, and what he perceives as her naiveté. Ford cooks up an idea to pimp Vera out to the Count for $100,000, easy money, if he can only talk Vera into it. Incredibly, she agrees. Everything appears to be going even better than planned.

But both men have gravely underestimated Vera, who has an agenda of her own. Ford and the Count unwittingly play right into her hands, and when her plan of deception and manipulation comes to fruition, the results are staggering.

Cast 
 Neve Campbell as Vera Barrie
 Frederick Weller as Ford Welles
 Dominic Chianese as Count Tommaso Lupo
 Ashley Shelton as Ashley
 James Toback as Professor Hassan Al-Ibrahim Ben Rabinowitz
 Oliver "Power" Grant as Power
 Mike Tyson as himself
 Lori Singer as herself

Critical reception
When Will I Be Loved received generally negative reviews. The films holds a score of 32%, based on 73 reviews, on the review aggregator site Rotten Tomatoes. Its consensus says "Neve Campbell bares all in this seemingly misogynistic trifle." Metacritic gave the film a 39/100 indicating "generally unfavorable reviews."

Despite being reviled by most critics, Roger Ebert gave the film four out of four stars, writing "When Will I Be Loved is like a jazz solo that touches familiar themes on its way to a triumphant and unexpected conclusion."

References 
Notes

External links 
 
 
 
 
 

2004 films
2000s English-language films
2000s erotic drama films
Films directed by James Toback
American erotic drama films
2004 drama films
2000s American films